Oleg Nikolayevich Perepelitsyn (born 3 August 1969 in Kamyshin) is a former Russian football player.

References

1969 births
People from Kamyshin
Living people
Soviet footballers
Russian footballers
FC Tekstilshchik Kamyshin players
Russian Premier League players
FC Sodovik Sterlitamak players
Association football defenders
Sportspeople from Volgograd Oblast